The Montauk Cutoff is an abandoned railroad right-of-way in Long Island City, Queens, New York City, that connected the Long Island Rail Road's Main Line and Lower Montauk Branch.

Route

The Montauk Cutoff is a cutoff approximately one-third of a mile in length and was double-tracked for its entire length. It begins just west of Sunnyside and Arch Street Yards, after which it runs west parallel to Skillman Avenue and passes over the tracks leading to the East River Tunnels and Hunterspoint Avenue. It then runs elevated across several blocks in an industrial section of Long Island City, before crossing the Cabin M Bridge—a swing bridge over Dutch Kills—and meeting the Montauk Branch immediately to the east of Dutch Kills Bridge at Blissville Yard.

History of operation
The Montauk Cutoff received a charter for construction in 1907 and was likely completed in 1908. It was originally constructed to allow trains from the Montauk Branch to directly access Sunnyside Yard, which was opened by the Pennsylvania Railroad in 1910. Following its opening, the Montauk Cutoff was primarily used by freight trains; it was constructed contemporaneously with other freight connections in Queens, including the Hell Gate Line (which now also sees Amtrak passenger service). On weekdays, the Montauk Cutoff was also used in lieu of a turntable (in essence, as a wye track) to turn diesel locomotives in Long Island City – then the main terminus for non-electric trains, which are not allowed to enter the East River Tunnels and Penn Station. As there was no turntable at Long Island City, west-facing locomotives from westbound trains would run around the cutoff after the trains discharged their passengers; the turned locomotives could then pull eastbound trains later in the day. 

In the late 1990s, this practice was discontinued, as the LIRR's new diesel equipment (EMD DE30AC and DM30AC locomotives and C3 coaches) included cab cars, which enable remote control of the locomotive from the opposite end of the train and eliminate the need to turn locomotives in daily operations. Between the 1970s and 1990s, freight traffic into Long Island City also decreased, and in the 1990s, the MTA ceased freight operations with the sale of the LIRR's freight division to the New York and Atlantic Railway. As a result, the Montauk Cutoff saw less use and began to fall into disrepair.

Abandonment and possible reuse

The MTA has not used the Montauk Cutoff since its freight operations ended and the replacement of its diesel fleet—between 1989 and the late 1990s. Since then, the right-of-way has been overgrown and has seen graffiti, trespassers, homeless camps, and guerrilla gardening. In 2013, some local residents obtained a lease from the MTA to use a part of the abandoned right-of-way as a community garden; it was first conceived in 2011 as a guerrilla garden and is still operative .

In 2015, the MTA announced that it was decommissioning the Montauk Cutoff. It also announced that it was seeking concepts for reuse of the right-of-way. Some potential uses include an expanded garden, urban farm, or a park resembling the High Line in Manhattan, though the MTA announced that it does not want to sell the structure, as it wants to keep open the possibility of reuse as transportation infrastructure. A part of the Montauk Cutoff was later demolished to expand yard space for the East Side Access project.

See also
 Rockaway Beach Branch
 Bay Ridge Branch

References

Closed railway lines in the United States
Long Island City
Long Island Rail Road
Rail freight transportation in New York City
Railroad cutoffs
Railroads on Long Island
Transportation in Queens, New York